Pippa Grange is a British applied psychologist, author and the Head of People and Team Development at The Football Association until the end of 2019. She is the founder of the consultancy Bluestone Edge.

Early life and education 
Grange was born in Harrogate, Yorkshire. She studied psychology at Loughborough University. She played in the national basketball league.

Career 
In 1996 Grange moved to Adelaide on a one-year contract to work in basketball development. Grange completed a Vincent Fairfax Fellowship at the St James Ethics Centre. She earned a doctorate in Applied Psychology at Victoria University, Australia. Her thesis, The Stress Is Unbearable; I Hope It Lasts, looked at the relationship between stress and performance in sport.

Grange was appointed general manager of culture and leadership of the Australian Football League Players Association by Brendon Gale. In 2008 she criticised the Australian Football League for abandoning well known AFL player Ben Cousins during his struggles with drug addiction. She founded the consultancy Bluestone Edge in 2010. They worked with the AFL football and rugby leagues, as well as the olympic team. In 2012 she helped the Australian Swim Team after their failure at the olympics. She was chair of the AFL Responsible Alcohol Steering Committee and the Inclusion and Diversity campaign to raise acceptance of homosexuality.

In 2014 Grange published Ethical Leadership in Sport: What’s your ENDgame?, a guidebook to navigating leadership positions in sports. Grange was appointed Head of People and Team Development for The Football Association in November 2017. She was responsible for developing the psychological resilience of the players. Grange is based at St George's Park National Football Centre and works with the men's and women's teams, coaches and staff.

On 27 July 2019, it was announced that Grange would leave her role at The FA by the end of 2019 to focus on 'the broadening definition of success and winning in sport, especially for woman and girls'

References 

Living people
British psychologists
British women psychologists
Alumni of Loughborough University
20th-century British psychologists
21st-century British psychologists
Year of birth missing (living people)